Monteagle is a locality in the South West Slopes region of New South Wales, Australia.

References

External links

Towns in New South Wales
Hilltops Council